Kagoshima Arena is an indoor sporting arena located in Kagoshima, Japan. The capacity of the arena is 5,000 and was opened in 1992. It hosted some matches for the 2003 FIVB Women's World Cup.

External links 
Kagoshima Arena

Basketball venues in Japan
Indoor arenas in Japan
Sports venues in Kagoshima Prefecture
Buildings and structures in Kagoshima
Sports venues completed in 1992
1992 establishments in Japan